{{Infobox museum
|name= McLarty Treasure Museum
|image= McLarty Treasure Museum Sign.jpg

|map_type= Florida
|coordinates = 
|established= 1971<ref name="Framed photo">The framed photo of the museum on display at the official opening, and currently on display in the museum, bears the official opening date of March 27, 1971.</ref>
|location= 13180 North A1AVero Beach, Florida ,
|type= Maritime Archaeology
|visitors= 
|director= Florida Park Service
|curator= 
|publictransit=
|website= 
}}

The McLarty Treasure Museum is located at 13180 North A1A on North Hutchinson Island, north of Windsor and Vero Beach, Florida, on the barrier island at the north end of Indian River County.  The museum occupies part of the former site of the Survivors' and Salvagers' Camp - 1715 Fleet, and is part of Sebastian Inlet State Park.  It houses exhibits on the history of the 1715 Spanish treasure fleet, and it features artifacts, displays, and an observation deck that overlooks the Atlantic Ocean. An A&E Network production, The Queen's Jewels and the 1715 Fleet'', is shown, telling of the fleet's attempt to return to Spain when a hurricane struck off the Florida coast 300 years ago.

The property for the museum was donated to the State by Mr. Robert McLarty, a retired Atlanta attorney who lived in Vero Beach.

See also
List of maritime museums in the United States

Notes

Gallery

External links

"Additional Information for Sebastian Inlet State Park". Some information on the McLarty Treasure Museum.

Archaeology of shipwrecks
Museums in Indian River County, Florida
Buildings and structures in Vero Beach, Florida
Maritime museums in Florida
Archaeological museums in Florida
History museums in Florida